Alastair Pennycook (born 14 July 1957) is an applied linguist. He is Emeritus Professor of Language, Society and Education at the University of Technology Sydney, and a Research Professor at the Centre for Multilingualism in Society Across the Lifespan at the University of Oslo. He was elected a fellow of the Australian Academy of the Humanities in 2016.

Books

References

Living people
Linguists of English
Academic staff of the University of Technology Sydney
Fellows of the Australian Academy of the Humanities
1957 births